The Northern Tupi–Guarani languages (also known as Tupi–Guarani VIII) are a subgroup of the Tupi–Guarani language family.

Along with the Timbira and Tenetehara languages, the Northern Tupi–Guarani languages form part of the lower Tocantins-Mearim linguistic area.

Languages
The Northern Tupi–Guarani languages are:

Anambé of Ehrenreich
Emerillon
Guajá
Wayampi
Zo'é
Takunyapé
Urubú–Kaapor
Wayampipukú

References